The Pannonian Steppe is a variety of grassland ecosystems found in the Pannonian Basin. It is an exclave of the Great Eurasian Steppe, found in modern-day Austria, Bulgaria, Hungary, Romania, Serbia and Slovakia.

Geography

The Pannonian Steppe is an exclave of the Eurasian Steppe. The climate is continental.

The part of the Pannonian Steppe in Hungary is a grassland biome on the Great Hungarian Plain (Alföld) around the River Tisza in the eastern part of Hungary as well as on the western part of Hungary and in the Austrian Burgenland. The landscape has been widely cultivated and the original landscape is now found only in a few places, for example in Hortobágy National Park. The characteristic landscape is composed of treeless plains, saline steppes and salt lakes, and includes scattered sand dunes, low, wet forests and freshwater marshes along the floodplains of the ancient rivers. About three hundred species of birds can be found here.

The Čenkovská steppe near Mužla is the only steppe national nature reserve in Slovakia. The protected area declared in 1951 covers a total of 83 hectares.

Apart from the Čenkovská forest-steppe, other notable steppe and forest-steppe biomes in Slovakia are located mostly around the Danubian and East Slovak plains and the southern ranges of the Pramatra system. Two of the biomes are Devínska Kobyla and the Slovak Karst (connects to Aggtelek in Hungary).

The part of the Pannonian steppe in Austria is present in Burgenland mainly around Lake Neusiedl.

See also
Central Europe
Puszta

References

External links
Meleckova, 2009, Cenkovska step
National Park Hortobágy - The Puszta

Eurasian Steppe
Geography of Hungary
Plains of Hungary
Geography of Serbia